The 1976–77 WHA season was the fifth season of the World Hockey Association (WHA). Prior to the season, the Toronto Toros moved to Birmingham, Alabama and became the Birmingham Bulls. The Cleveland Crusaders attempted to move to South Florida, but instead became the short-lived second incarnation of the Minnesota Fighting Saints and folded after playing 42 games. With the death of the Saints, the WHA left the last market it had been sharing with the NHL. The remaining 11 teams finished the season, playing 80 or 81 games. 

With the reduction of teams before the start of the season, the league returned to a two-division setup, eliminating the Canadian Division. 

The Avco World Trophy winners were the Quebec Nordiques, defeating the Winnipeg Jets four games to three; it was the only WHA final series that went the full seven games.

Regular season standings

Player stats

Scoring leaders
Bolded numbers indicate season leaders

GP = Games played; G = Goals; A = Assists; Pts = Points; PIM = Penalty minutes

Leading goaltenders 
Bolded numbers indicate season leaders

GP = Games played; Min = Minutes played; W = Wins; L = Losses; T = Ties, GA = Goals against; GA = Goals against; SO = Shutouts; SV% = Save percentage; GAA = Goals against average

Avco World Trophy Playoffs

WHA awards

Trophies

All-Star Team

References
HockeyDB

 
2
2
World Hockey Association seasons